Retusa truncatula is a species of very small head-shield sea snail or barrel-bubble snail, a marine gastropod mollusk in the family Retusidae

The subspecies Retusa truncatula var. mammilata: is a synonym of Retusa mammillata (Philippi, 1836)

Description
The shell is minute with a flattened spire and longitudinal striations. The colour of the living animal is white. The adult length is usually less than 4 mm.

Distribution
This species occurs in South Africa, from False Bay to Durban in shallow estuaries. It is also known from northern Europe, the Mediterranean Sea and the Canary Islands.

Natural history
This small sea snail lives from the intertidal zone to just below the low water mark. It burrows in the mud or sand of tidal marshes, and feeds on foraminiferans.

References

 Thiele J. (1925). Gastropoden der Deutschen Tiefsee-Expedition. II Teil. Wissenschaftliche Ergebnisse der Deutschen Tiefsee-Expedition auf dem Dampfer "Valdivia" 1898-1899. 17(2): 35-382, pls 13-46
 Nordsieck, F. (1972). Die europäischen Meeresschnecken (Opisthobranchia mit Pyramidellidae; Rissoacea). Vom Eismeer bis Kapverden, Mittelmeer und Schwarzes Meer. Gustav Fischer, Stuttgart. XIII + 327 pp.
 Gosliner, T. 1987. Nudibranchs of southern Africa: A guide to Opisthobranch molluscs of southern Africa Sea. Challengers, Monterey.
 de Kluijver, M. J.; Ingalsuo, S. S.; de Bruyne, R. H. (2000). Macrobenthos of the North Sea [CD-ROM]: 1. Keys to Mollusca and Brachiopoda. World Biodiversity Database CD-ROM Series. Expert Center for Taxonomic Identification (ETI): Amsterdam, The Netherlands. ISBN 3-540-14706-3. 1 cd-rom.
 Gofas, S.; Le Renard, J.; Bouchet, P. (2001). Mollusca. in: Costello, M.J. et al. (Ed.) (2001). European register of marine species: a check-list of the marine species in Europe and a bibliography of guides to their identification. Collection Patrimoines Naturels. 50: pp. 180–213.
 Ceulemans, L.; Van Dingenen, F.; Landau B. M. (2018). The lower Pliocene gastropods of Le Pigeon Blanc (Loire-Atlantique, northwest France). Part 5 – Neogastropoda (Conoidea) and Heterobranchia (fine). Cainozoic Research. 18(2): 89-176.

External links
 Bruguière J.G. (1789-1792). Encyclopédie méthodique ou par ordre de matières. Histoire naturelle des vers, volume 1. Paris: Pancoucke. Pp. i-xviii, 1-344
 Adams, J. (1800). Descriptions of some minute British shells. Transactions of the Linnean Society of London. 5(1): 1-6
 Maton, W. G. & Rackett, T. (1807). A descriptive catalogue of the British Testacea. Transactions of the Linnean Society of London. 8 (17): 17-250, 5 pls
  Brown, T. (1827). Illustrations of the conchology of Great Britain and Ireland. Drawn from nature. W.H. Lizars and D. Lizars, Edinburgh and S. Highley, London. 144 pp., 52 pls.
 Philippi, R. A. (1836). Enumeratio molluscorum Siciliae cum viventium tum in tellure tertiaria fossilium, quae in itinere suo observavit. Vol. 1. I-XIV, 1-303, Tab. XIII-XXVIII. Schropp, Berlin
  Monterosato, T. A. di. (1890). Conchiglie della profondità del mare di Palermo. Il Naturalista Siciliano. 9(6): 140-151 [March 1st, 1890; 9(7): 157-166]
 Locard, A. (1886). Prodrome de malacologie française. Catalogue général des mollusques vivants de France. Mollusques marins. Lyon: H. Georg & Paris: Baillière. x + 778 pp
 Pallary, P. (1904-1906). Addition à la faune malacologique du Golfe de Gabès. Journal de Conchyliologie. 52(3): 212-248, pl. 7 [25 October 1904; 54(2): 77-124, pl. 4]

Retusidae
Gastropods described in 1792